Charles Henry Walsh (27 October 1910 – 24 April 1954) was an English footballer who played as an inside forward in the Football League for Brentford. He made one FA Cup appearance for Arsenal in 1933. Injury forced Walsh into early retirement in 1935.

Honours 
Brentford
 Football League Third Division South: 1932–33

Career statistics

References

1910 births
1954 deaths
Footballers from Greater London
Brentford F.C. players
English Football League players
Arsenal F.C. players
Association football inside forwards
Hendon F.C. players
English footballers